Tephritis heiseri is a species of tephritid or fruit flies in the genus Tephritis of the family Tephritidae.

Distribution
Central Europe & West Siberia to the Caucasus, Kazakhstan & Mongolia.

References

Tephritinae
Insects described in 1865
Diptera of Europe
Diptera of Asia